Shader is the twelfth album by electronic musician Vektroid (under the one-time alias of Sacred Tapestry). The album's musical style incorporates more drone and ambient influences compared to previous Vektroid vaporwave releases, and also includes elements of progressive electronic and new-age music.

A remastered and edited version of the album titled Shader Complete, was released in 2016. Changes from the original album include different titles, altered song lengths and structures, and the addition of two tracks recorded during the Color Ocean Road sessions. The album was re-released on vinyl and CD in 2018.

Track listing

Notes
 "Spirited Child" features samples from "It's Your Move" by Diana Ross, as well as リサフランク420 / 現代のコンピュー also recorded by Vektroid under the alias Macintosh Plus, which also samples the song by Ross.

References

2012 albums
Vektroid albums